Yudelkis Martínez Genaro (born September 11, 1979) is a female long-distance runner from Cuba. She represented her native country at the 2003 Pan American Games in Santo Domingo, Dominican Republic, where she won the silver medal in the women's 10,000 metres event behind Mexico's Adriana Fernández.

Competition record

References
 Profile
 

1979 births
Living people
Cuban female long-distance runners
Athletes (track and field) at the 2003 Pan American Games
Pan American Games silver medalists for Cuba
Pan American Games medalists in athletics (track and field)
Medalists at the 2003 Pan American Games